Banco di Roma was an Italian bank based in Rome, Lazio region. It was established on 9 March 1880.

Along with Credito Italiano and Banca Commerciale Italiana they were considered as bank of national interests. In 1991, the bank was merged with Banco di Santo Spirito and Cassa di Risparmio di Roma to form Banca di Roma, a predecessor of Capitalia (which was acquired by UniCredit in 2007).

Banco di Roma also owned a reported 30% stake in a Belgian bank in 1989. The Belgian subsidiary, Banco di Roma (Belgio) S.A., was acquired by Monte dei Paschi di Siena (MPS) in 1992.

Banco di Roma also sold subsidiary Banco di Perugia to Banca Toscana, a subsidiary of MPS in 1990.

References

Banks established in 1880
Italian companies established in 1880
Banks disestablished in 1992
Italian companies disestablished in 1992
Defunct banks of Italy
Companies based in Rome
Capitalia Group